Adams County is a county in the U.S. state of Iowa. As of the 2020 census, the population was 3,704, making it Iowa's least-populous county. Its county seat is Corning.

History
Adams County was established by the state legislature in 1851 and named in honor of the second President of the United States, John Adams, or his son, the sixth President, John Quincy Adams (sources differ). The county was finally organized and separated from Pottawattamie County on March 12, 1853. Its original size was later reduced by the creation of Montgomery and Union counties.

The first county seat was Quincy, Iowa. In 1872, it was moved to Corning.

Geography

Major highways
 U.S. Highway 34
 Iowa Highway 148

Adjacent counties
Cass County (northwest)
Adair County (northeast)
Union County (east)
Taylor County (south)
Montgomery County (west)

Demographics

2020 census
There were 1,888 housing units of which 1,614 were occupied.

2010 census
As of the 2010 United States Census, there were 4,029 people, 1,715 households, and 1,126 families residing in the county. The racial makeup of the county was 98.1% white, 0.6% Asian, 0.5% American Indian, 0.2% black or African American, 0.1% from other races, and 0.5% from two or more races. Those of Hispanic or Latino origin made up 0.9% of the population. In terms of ancestry, 33.6% were German, 15.9% were Irish, 14.7% were English, and 4.9% were American.

Of the 1,715 households, 25.7% had children under the age of 18 living with them, 56.2% were married couples living together, 5.8% had a female householder with no husband present, 34.3% were non-families, and 29.0% of all households were made up of individuals. The average household size was 2.28 and the average family size was 2.81. The median age was 46.7 years.

The median income for a household in the county was $40,368 and the median income for a family was $52,782. Males had a median income of $33,505 versus $25,332 for females. The per capita income for the county was $23,549. About 6.0% of families and 12.2% of the population were below the poverty line, including 8.9% of those under age 18 and 18.5% of those age 65 or over.

Communities

Cities, Towns, Villages and Hamlets
Carbon
Carl
Corning (county seat)
Lenox (mostly in Taylor County)
Mt. Etna
Nodaway
Prescott
Williamson

Population ranking
The population ranking of the following table is based on the 2020 census of Adams County.

† county seat

Government

Civil Townships

 Carl
 Colony
 Douglas
 Grant
 Jasper
 Lincoln
 Mercer
 Nodaway
 Prescott
 Quincy
 Union
 Washington

Politics

See also

National Register of Historic Places listings in Adams County, Iowa

References

Further reading

External links

Adams County government's website

 

 
1853 establishments in Iowa
Populated places established in 1853